
Year 817 (DCCCXVII) was a common year starting on Thursday (link will display the full calendar) of the Julian calendar.

Events 
 By place 
 Europe 
 Summer – Emperor Louis I issues an Ordinatio Imperii, an imperial decree that lays out plans for an orderly succession. He divides the Frankish Empire among his three sons: Lothair, the eldest, is proclaimed co-emperor in Aachen, and becomes the overlord of his brothers. He receives the dominion of Burgundy (including German and Gallic parts). Pepin, the second son, is proclaimed king of Aquitaine, and receives Gascony (including the marche around Toulouse and parts of Septimania); Louis (the youngest son) is proclaimed king of Bavaria, and receives the dominions of East Francia.
 Prince Grimoald IV is assassinated by a complot of Lombard nobles vying for his throne. He is succeeded by Sico as ruler of Benevento (Southern Italy), who is forced to pay an annual tribute of 7,000 solidi to Louis I.

 North Africa 
 Ziyadat Allah I becomes the third Aghlabid emir of Ifriqiya (modern Tunisia). During his rule, the relationship between the Aghlabid Dynasty and the Arab troops remains strained.

 By topic 
 Religion 
 January 24 – Pope Stephen IV dies at Rome after a 7-month reign, and is succeeded by Paschal I as the 98th pope of the Catholic Church.
 Synod of Aachen: The council adopts a capitulare monasticum, containing the Benedictine rules of  monastic life in the Frankish realm.

Births 
 Abu Dawud, Muslim hadith compiler (or 818)
 Al-Fath ibn Khaqan, Muslim governor (or 818)
 Pepin, count of Vermandois (approximate date)
 Pyinbya, king of Burma (d. 876)

Deaths 
 January 24 – Stephen IV, pope of the Catholic Church
 Grimoald IV, Lombard prince of Benevento
 Quriaqos of Tagrit, patriarch of Antioch 
 Tibraide mac Cethernach, abbot of Clonfert
 Theophanes the Confessor, Byzantine monk (or 818)
 Wu Yuanji, general of the Tang Dynasty

References